Paul-Hervé Essola Tchamba (born 13 December 1981) is a Cameroonian former professional footballer who played as a midfielder. He signed for FC Arsenal Kyiv in June 2007. Essola had previously arrived in Ukraine six months previously to play for FC Stal Alchevsk, having been released by French club SC Bastia. In January 2008, he was named in the Cameroon squad for the 2008 African Cup of Nations.

References

External links
 
 
 
 
 Information about Paul Essola

1981 births
Living people
Association football midfielders
Cameroonian footballers
Cameroon international footballers
Cameroonian expatriate footballers
2008 Africa Cup of Nations players
SC Bastia players
US Créteil-Lusitanos players
Cameroonian expatriate sportspeople in France
Ligue 1 players
Ligue 2 players
China League One players
Ukrainian Premier League players
Expatriate footballers in China
Expatriate footballers in France
Expatriate footballers in Ukraine
Cameroonian expatriate sportspeople in Ukraine
FC Stal Alchevsk players
FC Arsenal Kyiv players
Beijing Sport University F.C. players
FC Dnipro players